Dimitrios Samaras (born 3 June 1978) is a Greek footballer who plays as a centre back.

Career
Born in Thessaloniki, Samaras spent most of his youth career playing for Lykoi in the Greek third division. In January 2005, he signed for Veria and would eventually play with the club in the Super League Greece during the 2007–08 season.

References

External links
Profile at The Football League's website
Guardian's Stats Centre

1978 births
Living people
Greek footballers
Veria F.C. players
Doxa Drama F.C. players
Association football central defenders
Footballers from Thessaloniki